HMS Chub (or Chubb) was a British Royal Navy Ballahoo-class schooner of four 12-pounder carronades and a crew of 20. The prime contractor for the vessel was Goodrich & Co., in Bermuda, and she was launched in 1807. She and her crew were lost when she was wrecked in August 1812.


Service
Chub was commissioned in March 1807 under Lieutenant Wentworth Parsons Croke. Chub may have assisted at the invasion of Martinique between January and February 1809. If so, she does not appear among the vessels whose crews qualified for the Naval General Service Medal when the Admiralty awarded it in 1847.

Lieutenant William Innes replaced Croke in June 1809 (who went on to command the schooner ), and was in turn replaced by Lieutenant Samuel Nisbett in 1812.

On 5 March 1812 Chub left Bermuda to search for Mary, Wilson, master, which had been sailing from Tobago to London. Admiral Sawyer had received information that Mary was in great distress from leaks and trying to reach Bermuda. Chub returned two days later without having found Mary. By 8 April Mary had still not arrived at Bermuda and it was feared that she had foundered.

Chub captured several vessels in 1812 while on the Halifax station. On 18 July she captured the privateer Eliza and on 6 August the merchantman Grace. Then on 18 July she recaptured Ann, M'Donald, master, which had been sailing from Cadiz to St John's when the American privateer Teazer captured her the day before. Chub brought Ann into Liverpool.

Chubb had earlier stopped at Liverpool, Nova Scotia and taken on board some volunteers who wanted to go a cruise with her. A chain-shot from Emulous killed two of these volunteers, Ebenezer Herrington (or Harrington), and John Scott. Herrington was buried in the Old Burying Ground in Halifax. Chubb returned the surviving volunteers to Liverpool and resumed her cruise.

Fate
Chub was driven ashore on 14 August on the "Sisters" (Black Rocks) within two miles of the Sambro Island Light near Halifax, Nova Scotia. Nisbett and all on board perished. She was stationed with the blockade of the American fleet at the time of sinking.

Citations

References
 
 
 
  
 
 
 

1807 ships
Ballahoo-class schooners
Maritime incidents in 1812
Ships built in Bermuda
Shipwrecks of the Nova Scotia coast
Warships lost with all hands